is a Japanese video game developer, best known as the primary developer of the mainline Pokémon series of role-playing video games published by Nintendo and The Pokémon Company.

History

Predating the video game company, Game Freak was a self-published video game magazine created by Satoshi Tajiri and Ken Sugimori in the 1980s. The first issue was published in 1983 by Tajiri. Sugimori would join the magazine at a later date as an illustrator after finding the magazine in a shop and liking it. Tajiri also used "Game Freak" as his pen name when he wrote as a freelance writer for publications such as Family Computer Magazine and Famicom Tsūshin.

On April 26, 1989, Tajiri, Sugimori and Junichi Masuda started a video game development company with the same name. One of Game Freak's first games was the Nintendo Entertainment System action and puzzle game Quinty, which was released in North America as Mendel Palace.  Its most popular series, Pokémon—the romanized portmanteau of the Japanese brand —is published by The Pokémon Company and Nintendo worldwide, with Nintendo being the sole distributor.

In October 2015, Game Freak bought Koa Games, a mobile development company.

In May 2019, Game Freak director Masayuki Onoue revealed that Game Freak is increasingly prioritizing original game creation, in order to grow the experience of its staff. The company's Gear Project initiative, which encourages creators to pitch original game ideas during quiet periods, has so far resulted in original games HarmoKnight, Pocket Card Jockey, Tembo the Badass Elephant and Giga Wrecker.

In February 2020, Game Freak transferred from its building in Tokyo to a much larger office near Nintendo, which planned to relocate four other divisions, plus other companies based in Kanda-Nishikicho, Tokyo. With this move, Game Freak is currently in the same building as Nintendo EPD Tokyo, Nintendo PTD Tokyo, HAL Laboratory and 1-Up Studio.

On June 1, 2022, it was announced that Masuda stepped down from his position as managing director at Game Freak, left the company and that he would be Chief Creative Fellow at The Pokemon Company effectively on the same day.

Games

Notes

References

External links
  
 Game Freak at IGN

Japanese companies established in 1989
Software companies based in Tokyo
Video game companies established in 1989
Video game companies of Japan
Pokémon
Video game development companies